Rob Goossens (b. Schriek, 1943) pseudonym Rob Goswin is a Belgian artist and poet.

He is a teacher at the Royal Technical Athenaeum in Westerlo. In 1968, he founded, together with painter Jef Van Grieken and writer-actor Gerd de Ley, the magazine Rimschi. He was also editor of the magazine Impuls and currently editor of Imago.

Bibliography
 Vanitas, Vanitas (novel)

Awards
 1973 - Arkprijs van het Vrije Woord

See also
 Flemish literature

Sources
 Rob Goswin

1943 births
Living people
Flemish writers
Ark Prize of the Free Word winners
People from Heist-op-den-Berg